Station Road was a stadium in Pendlebury, near Manchester, England. It was the home of Swinton Rugby League Club between 1929 and 1992 and was widely recognised as one of the finest grounds in the Rugby League.

Swinton moved to Station Road when they were at their peak, having won all four major trophies ("All Four Cups") the previous season, one of only three clubs (the others being Hunslet and Huddersfield) ever to do so. The decision to purchase the land, which stood alongside the railway line and Swinton railway station, was made after a breakdown in negotiations with their existing landlord at their Chorley Road ground, their home since 1887.

International venue

In its heyday it boasted a capacity of 60,000, although with a record attendance of 44,621 for Warrington v Wigan in the 1951 Challenge Cup semi-final this was never really tested. All in all 19 internationals (including 15 test matches), 5 Championship finals, 17 Lancashire County Cup finals, 4 Premiership finals and 30 Rugby League Challenge Cup semi-finals were played at the ground. In addition two World Cup matches were played at Station Road.

The biggest win in any international match at Station Road was when Australia defeated Great Britain by 50-12 in the second Ashes test during the 1963 Kangaroo tour. Played in front of 30,843 fans, the match became known as the "Swinton Massacre" as the Kangaroos ran riot. er Ken Irvine crossed for 3 tries giving the British fans (and his opposite, Lions winger Mick Sullivan) a taste of his legendary speed, while other stars for Australia were Reg Gasnier and Peter Dimond who crossed for 2 tries each, and Gasnier's  partner Graeme Langlands scored 2 tries and kicked 7 goals. After winning the first test 28-2 at Wembley, the victory saw Australia regain the Ashes they had lost to the Lions at home in 1962.

1960 Rugby League World Cup

Britain's comprehensive victory over the French at Swinton was marred by the first double sending-off in World Cup annals, France's skipper Jean Barthe and Britain's second-rower Vince Karalius being despatched by Edouard Martung, a police inspector from Bordeaux.

1970 Rugby League World Cup

Britain eliminated New Zealand from the tournament, cruising to victory with five tries to three. 

List of Great Britain matches played at Station Road

Also seven England internationals were played at Station Road

Station Road also saw Swinton playing various Australian international touring sides.

Vandalism and closure

Fire damaged the disused Main Stand including offices and function rooms in July 1992, this was the last in a series of vandalism before the club moved out of Station Road. Station Road was sold at the end of the 1991–92 season by the club's directors to David McLean Homes for property development, part of the deal involved sponsoring the Lions in their first season post Station Road. The last match to be played at Station Road was a local derby versus Salford on 20 April 1992 with 3,487 witnessing Salford winning 26-18 and Ian Pickavance of Swinton scoring the last try. The site is now a housing estate.

External links
 Photos of Station Road

References

Defunct rugby league venues in England
Rugby League World Cup stadiums
Defunct sports venues in Greater Manchester
Sports venues demolished in 1992
Swinton, Greater Manchester
Demolished sports venues in the United Kingdom
1992 disestablishments in England
1929 establishments in England
Sports venues completed in 1929